Universiti Kuala Lumpur (UniKL) is a multi-campus technical university with its main campus based in Kuala Lumpur, Malaysia. Rated as a Tier-5 "Excellent University" by the Ministry of Higher Education Malaysia in 2009, 2011, 2013 and awarded Putra Brand Award in 2016. UniKL has 14 institutes spread across 12 campuses throughout Malaysia in Kuala Lumpur, Gombak, Cheras, Bangi, Kajang, Sepang, Taboh Naning, Pasir Gudang, Ipoh, Lumut and Kulim.

Programmes offered
Each institute under UniKL has a specialization. Educational programmes of UniKL are accredited by Malaysian Qualification Agency (MQA).

Campuses and institutes
In 2012 the university had around 20,500 local and international students studying at 11 campuses throughout the country, offering educational programs at professional certificate, diploma, degree, and postgraduate levels in the following fields:
 Medical science & technology
 Automation & industrial maintenance
 Mechatronics, air-conditioning
 Machine building & metal fabrication
 Product design & precision manufacturing
 Information technology
 Animation & multimedia
 Food technology, chemical & bioengineering
 Environmental technology
 Naval architecture
 Marine technology
 Automotive technology
 Aviation technology
 Electrical, electronics & telecommunication
 Quality engineering & industrial logistics
 Medical & allied health sciences
 Business, entrepreneurship & Islamic finance
 Oil & gas

The university provides foundation programmes to prepare students for entry into the degree studies. Alternatively, students with only SPM (Sijil Pelajaran Malaysia) or O-level equivalent can apply to do the diploma programmes. Students who have a recognised diploma may apply for entry into the degree programmes with credit transfer.

Universiti Kuala Lumpur Institute of Medical Science Technology (UniKL MESTECH)
Universiti Kuala Lumpur Institute of Medical Science Technology was incorporated in July 2008, Universiti Kuala Lumpur Institute of Medical Science Technology (UniKL MESTECH) is offering Diploma and Bachelor programmes in Medical Science Technology. The courses that are offered at Bachelor level are Bachelor of Biomedical Science and Bachelor of Environmental Health, while at Diploma level are Diploma in Medical Laboratory Technology, Diploma in Environmental Health and Diploma in Medical Assistant.

Address: Lot No. A1-1, Jalan TKS 1, Taman Kajang Sentral, 43000 Kajang, Selangor

Universiti Kuala Lumpur Malaysia France Institute (UniKL MFI)
Universiti Kuala Lumpur Malaysia France Institute was incorporated in February 1995 as a collaborative project between Malaysia and France. The institute, located in Bandar Baru Bangi, Selangor became a branch campus of Universiti Kuala Lumpur in 2003. The technical programmes offered in the institute were mostly developed in collaboration with education institutions in France. The UniKL MFI specialises in the fields of Industrial Automation, Robotics, Mechatronics, Automotive & Industrial Maintenance, Metal Fabrication and Refrigeration/Air Conditioning. The institute also prepare students for further studies in France at Degree and Master levels.

Address: Seksyen 14, Jalan Teras Jernang, 43650 Bandar Baru Bangi, Selangor

Universiti Kuala Lumpur British Malaysian Institute (UniKL BMI)
Universiti Kuala Lumpur British Malaysian Institute (UniKL BMI) was set up as a result of a partnership between the Malaysian and British government in 1998. Majlis Amanah Rakyat (MARA), representing the Malaysian government provided the infrastructure and manpower while the British government contributed support through industries such as the BAE Systems, British Airways, Standard Chartered Bank (M) Bhd and Rolls-Royce as well as its institutions which include Wigan & Leigh College and the University of Hertfordshire. The institute specialises in Electrical, Electronics, Medical Electronics and Telecommunication Technology.

Address: Batu 8 Jalan Sungai Pusu, 53100 Gombak, Selangor

Universiti Kuala Lumpur Malaysian Spanish Institute (UniKL MSI)
Universiti Kuala Lumpur Malaysian Spanish Institute (UniKL MSI) began its operation at a temporary campus in August 2002 and moved to its main campus on a  piece of land in Kulim Hi Tech Park, Kedah in December 2003. A collaborative effort between the Malaysian and Spanish government, UniKL MSI offers automotive manufacturing engineering programmes with a combination of theoretical training and practical application.

Address: Kulim Hi Tech Park, 09000 Kulim, Kedah

Malaysian Institute of Information Technology, Universiti Kuala Lumpur City Campus (UniKL MIIT)

Formerly known as Institut Infotech MARA, Malaysian Institute of Information Technology (MIIT) has provided IT education since 1982. It started off as Electronic Data Processing School of MARA and its objective then was to impart knowledge in computer programming.

This 31-storey city campus building has 7,201 square feet of lobby area with one mezzanine level, made into a student counselling and discussion area. Facilities include sick bay, gym, Bestari Lecture Hall which fits 225 people, three-storey library area with an IT Resource Centre, six incubators, 30 lecture rooms and a studio. Levels 4 to 24 are used for academic purposes mainly lectures. Level 25 onwards are the administration levels, which house the Deans’ Offices, Institute for Research & Postgraduate Studies, Centre for Preparatory Studies, Centre for Teaching & Learning, Centre for Quality Assurance, Centre for Student Entrepreneurship, Administration, Finance, Human Resource, Corporate Affairs and Entrepreneur Development and Innovation Divisions. The president's office is on the 31st floor.

The 31 laboratories include Multimedia Lab, JAVA/Ms.NET Lab, Rational Lab, Networking Lab, CAD-CAM Lab, CNC Simulators Lab, CAD & Design Lab, CCM & Metrology Lab, Mechanical & Materials Lab, Mechatronics Lab, Graduates’ Project Lab, Analog Lab and Language Lab.

Address: 1016, Jalan Sultan Ismail, 50250 Kuala Lumpur

Universiti Kuala Lumpur Malaysian Institute of Aviation Technology (UniKL MIAT)
Universiti Kuala Lumpur Malaysian Institute of Aviation Technology (UniKL MIAT) is the pioneer aviation institution in Malaysia and it is a wholly owned subsidiary of Majlis Amanah Rakyat (MARA). It is also the first Maintenance Training Organisation (MTO) approved by the Department of Civil Aviation Malaysia (DCA) to offer aircraft maintenance programmes.

Initially established as part of MARA Vocational Training or Institut Kemahiran MARA (IKM) in Jasin, Malacca for sheet metal and composite repair program.  With Northrop-Rice U.S.A as the technology provider; it became MARA-Northrop Rice Institute (MNRI) and transferred to Subang; Selangor. With the expansion of the programmes and increased student enrollment, MNRI became known as the Malaysian Institute of Aviation Technology Sdn. Bhd. (MIAT) and moved to its current facility in Jenderam Hulu; Selangor closer to KLIA. When MARA combined all its high education institutes to be part of Universiti Kuala Lumpur, MIAT hereon known as Universiti Kuala Lumpur Malaysian Institute of Aviation Technology (UniKL MIAT). Further expansion of the program, UniKL-MIAT has opened up another campus facility located within the premises of the Subang airport in Subang, Shah Alam, Selangor.

Address: Jalan Jenderam Hulu, Kampung Jenderam Hulu, 43900 Sepang, Selangor

Universiti Kuala Lumpur Malaysian Institute of Chemical and Bioengineering Technology (UniKL MICET)
Universiti Kuala Lumpur Malaysian Institute of Chemical and Bioengineering Technology (UniKL MICET) is an institution of higher learning in the country that provides chemical based technology education. It is located within the Bio Valley of Malaysia.

Address: Bandar Vendor, Lot 1988, 19, 78000 Alor Gajah, Malacca

Universiti Kuala Lumpur Malaysian Institute of Marine Engineering Technology (UniKL MIMET)
Universiti Kuala Lumpur Malaysian Institute of Marine Engineering Technology (UniKL MIMET) was established in collaboration between Majlis Amanah Rakyat (MARA) and International Training Australia (ITA) that represented the Australian government as a training provider. Its permanent campus is located in Lumut, Perak, relatively known as the home base of the Royal Malaysian Navy.

Universiti Kuala Lumpur Royal College of Medicine Perak (UniKL RCMP)
Becoming part of Universiti Kuala Lumpur in 2005, Universiti Kuala Lumpur Royal College of Medicine Perak (UniKL RCMP) offers bachelor, diploma and foundation programmes in  medicine & surgery, nursing, pharmacy, physiotherapy and radiology.
Address: 3, Jalan Greentown, 30450 Ipoh, Perak

Universiti Kuala Lumpur Malaysia - Italy Design Institute (UniKL MIDI)
Formally known as Institute of Product Design and Manufacturing (UniKL IPROM). Located in Cheras, Kuala Lumpur.

Address: 119, Jalan 7/91, Taman Shamelin Perkasa, 56100 Kuala Lumpur

Universiti Kuala Lumpur Malaysian Institute of Industrial Technology (UniKL MITEC)
UniKL MITEC, formerly known as UniKL Pasir Gudang, specialises in Industrial Process Instrumentation and Control Engineering. The ground-breaking ceremony of UniKL Pasir Gudang worth RM 196.5 million on a 24 hectare piece of land was officiated by the former Minister of Entrepreneur and Co-operative Development, Dato’ Seri Mohamed Khaled Nordin in March 2008. The campus was ready in 2010 at Pasir Gudang with the maximum capacity of 2,500 students.

UniKL MITEC offers Diploma and Bachelor programmes in Industrial Logistics (IL) which accredited and supported by Chartered Institute of Logistics and Transportation Malaysia, Quality Engineering (QE), Facility Maintenance Engineering (FaME) and Instrumentation & Control Engineering (ICE).

Address: Jln Persiaran Sinaran Ilmu, Bandar Seri Alam, Masai, 81750 Johor Bahru, Johor

Universiti Kuala Lumpur Business School (UBIS)
Universiti Kuala Lumpur Business School, formerly known as Universiti Kuala Lumpur International School of Entrepreneurship (UniKL ISE) was established in 2008. The school was established to pursue the university's vision to be the premier entrepreneurial technical university in the region. Its core mission is to train and mould managers and leaders who are capable of pursuing entrepreneurial ventures across industries, within a global context. It complements other institutes and colleges which provide technical fields of study by offering degree programs in Business, Finance, Accounting, Marketing and Entrepreneurship. 

Address: (Gurney Road Campus) Jalan Pesiaran Gurney, Kampung Datuk Keramat, 54000 Kuala Lumpur  (Quill City Mall Campus) Quill City Mall, Jalan Sultan Ismail, Bandar Wawasan, 50000 Kuala Lumpur

Postgraduate programmes 
Institute of Postgraduate Studies (IPS) was formed in 2005 and previously known as Institute of Research and Postgraduate Studies (IRPS) and Centre for Research and Postgraduate Studies (CRPS). Its functioning mainly to manage all aspects of postgraduate studies at UniKL, and in liaison with institutes, the admission, monitoring and also evaluation of theses and examinations. IPS will be responsible to coordinate, organize and ensure uniformity in the implementation of various postgraduate courses and programmes. In addition, IPS will also be involved in obtaining accreditation (in liaison with CQA) of the postgraduate programmes and the marketing activities involved to promote the programmes.

Rankings

References

Universities and colleges in Kuala Lumpur
 
Educational institutions established in 2002
2002 establishments in Malaysia
Private universities and colleges in Malaysia
Educational institutions in Malaysia